A basement show is a musical performance, often of the punk rock or hardcore punk variety, that is held in the basement of a residential home, rather than at a traditional venue. These are also sometimes referred to as "house shows" as they can happen anywhere in a residential house, not just in the basement.

Background
Basement shows are normally held for a variety of reasons, including:
 lack of a suitable venue in the area;
 convenience and relative ease;
 host can give much back to their local scene and community;
 shows hold important symbolic value to the DIY ethic and punk/hardcore culture;
 shows completely avoid any sort of corporate sponsorship; it is therefore considered the antithesis of selling out, and keeping the scene small and independent;
 lastly, basements are more suitable for smaller bands, with an audience of fewer than 50 people.

Some bands have written songs about this, such as Deerhunter's "Basement Scene," "Theme Song for a New Brunswick Basement Show" by  Lifetime and "It Sounds Better In The Basement" by The Devil Is Electric.  Basement shows also build on the notion of music being more than just performance, but about the building and strengthening of community. By opening one's home to these performances where people come together to share their artwork/music, they open up a community-based cultural exchange.

See also
 Punk rock
 Garage rock
 House concert

References

Punk
DIY culture
Underground culture